General Sir Neil Methuen Ritchie,  (29 July 1897 – 11 December 1983) was a British Army officer who saw service during both the world wars. He is most notable during the Second World War for commanding the British Eighth Army in the North African campaign from November 1941 until being dismissed in June 1942. Despite this, his career did not end. Ritchie later commanded XII Corps throughout the campaign in Northwest Europe, from June 1944 until Victory in Europe Day (VE Day) in May 1945.

Origins
Born near the Essequibo River in British Guiana on 29 July 1897, he was the second son of a Scottish planter, Dugald MacDougall Ritchie (1861-1925), and his wife Anna Catherine Leggatt (1860-1946), daughter of an English farmer. His elder brother was Alan MacDougall Ritchie, later a brigadier in the British Army, and he had two sisters.

Early life and First World War
After growing up in Malaya, he went to England and was educated at Lancing College and the Royal Military College, Sandhurst. Four months after the outbreak of the First World War in August 1914, he passed out from Sandhurst on 16 December 1914, when he was, at the age of just 17, commissioned as a second lieutenant into the Black Watch (Royal Highlanders). Among his fellow graduates was another future general, John Grover.

As he was too young, Ritchie was not sent overseas until after his 18th birthday in July 1915. He was promoted to lieutenant on 2 October, and served initially with the 1st Battalion, Black Watch, then part of the 1st Brigade of the 1st Division and one of the two Regular Army battalions in the regiment, in the trenches of the Western Front. Ritchie was wounded during the Battle of Loos. After recovering from his injuries he was promoted to the temporary rank of captain on 2 March 1916, and made an acting captain on 22 April. 

He later served with the 2nd Battalion (the other Regular Army battalion in the regiment) which was part of the 21st (Bareilly) Brigade in the 7th (Meerut) Division , a British Indian Army division, in the Middle East. He served during the Sinai and Palestine campaign and the Mesopotamian campaign, including in the fall of Baghdad in March 1917. On 5 January 1917 he became his battalion's adjutant. He won the Distinguished Service Order (DSO) on 25 August 1917 and, having been confirmed in his rank of captain on 19 November 1917, was awarded the Military Cross (MC) on 15 February 1919 for his actions during the Battle of Megiddo in September 1918. The citation for his MC reads:

Ritchie was also mentioned in despatches. The armistice of Mudros with the Ottoman Empire and the armistice with Germany followed soon after and brought the war to an end.

Between the wars
Ritchie remained in the army throughout the difficult interwar period. He served as adjutant to the 2nd Battalion, Black Watch until 28 February 1921. From 18 July 1923 until 30 September 1927,  he was a General Staff Officer Grade 3 (GSO3) at the War Office. He attended the Staff College, Camberley as a student from 1929 to 1930.

Graduating from the two-year course in December 1929, Ritchie served with his regiment until being sent to India and made a GSO2 with Northern Command, India, a post he held from 2 April 1933 until 1 April 1937. While there he was promoted, for the first time in almost sixteen years, to brevet major on 1 July 1933, followed by major on 2 June 1934, and brevet lieutenant colonel on 1 January 1936. 

On 3 January 1938 Ritchie transferred from the Black Watch, which by now he had been with for just over twenty-three years, to the King's Own Royal Regiment (Lancaster), and was promoted to lieutenant colonel. He became commanding officer of the 2nd Battalion, King's Own on the same date and took command of the battalion in Palestine, then engaged in internal security duties during the Arab revolt. Aided throughout this difficult period by his adjutant, Captain Richard Anderson, he commanded the battalion until August 1939, shortly before the Second World War began in September. For his services in Palestine Ritchie was mentioned in despatches. After handing over the battalion to Lieutenant Colonel John Hardy, Ritchie returned to England, where he was promoted to colonel on 26 August 1939 (with seniority backdated to 1 January) and was made a GSO1 at the Senior Officers' School at Sheerness, Kent.

Second World War

France and Belgium
After being promoted on 22 December 1939 to the acting rank of brigadier, he was made Brigadier-General Staff (BGS) to II Corps, commanded by Lieutenant-General Sir Alan Brooke. II Corps was then serving in France as part of the British Expeditionary Force (BEF). Ritchie seems to have immediately impressed Brooke, as on 3 January 1940 the latter wrote in his diary that "Ritchie, my new BGS, seems to be turning out well and should, I think, be good". When the so-called "Phoney War" came to an end in May 1940 with the German invasion of  western Europe, Ritchie further impressed Brooke by controlling the corps HQ in a calm and confident manner, thus enabling Brooke to concentrate on running the battle on his corps' front. After being evacuated to England Ritchie was again requested by Brooke when the latter was appointed to command a new "Second BEF". Accompanying Brooke to France, he was again sent back to England, after Brooke realised that further efforts to fight the Germans were pointless and, in his words, "I sent Neil Ritchie off home this evening [16 June] as I did not feel that any useful purpose could be served by retaining him any longer". For his services in France and Belgium Ritchie was made a Commander of the Order of the British Empire on 11 July 1940, and was mentioned in despatches on 26 July.

Service in the United Kingdom
Shortly afterwards Ritchie was made BGS with Southern Command, commanded by Lieutenant-General Claude Auchinleck who, like Brooke, thought highly of him. Ritchie was not there long, however,  at the relatively young age of forty-three, he received a promotion to the acting rank of major-general on 28 October 1940 and was made General Officer Commanding (GOC) of the 51st (Highland) Infantry Division on the same date. He held this post until June 1941 when he handed over to Major-General Douglas Wimberley.

North Africa and the Middle East
Ritchie's next posting was to the Middle East, where he served as Deputy Chief of the General Staff to General Archibald Wavell, Commander-in-Chief of Middle East Command. It was Auchinleck, who soon succeeded Wavell as C-in-C Middle East, who was to give Ritchie his highest field command, the British Eighth Army, in November 1941, following the dismissal of Lieutenant-General Alan Cunningham from that position. On 27 November 1941 Ritchie, whose rank of major-general was made temporary on 28 October 1941, was promoted to the acting rank of lieutenant general. For his period of service in the Middle East from July−October 1941, he was mentioned in despatches.

Ritchie's rise through the ranks coincided with the earliest phases of the war when British fortunes were at their lowest ebb. The Eighth Army, fighting in the North African campaign, was the only British land force engaging the German Army anywhere in the world. After some early successes against the Italians the British were pushed back following the arrival of the Afrika Korps under Erwin Rommel. Ritchie was originally intended as a temporary appointment until a suitable commander could be found, but in fact ended up commanding the Eighth Army for nearly seven months. He was in command of the Eighth Army at the Battle of Gazala in May–June 1942 where he failed to exercise strong command over the Army and the British and Commonwealth forces were heavily defeated, losing the port of Tobruk. He was sacked by Auchinleck on 25 June prior to the First Battle of El Alamein.

The historian Richard Mead has kind words for Ritchie:

Auchinleck is often seen as having appointed Ritchie, a relatively junior commander, in order to allow him to closely direct the battle himself while also commander of Middle East Command. Ritchie was criticised heavily both during and after the war for his failure to stop Rommel. Since then several commentators have come to his defence, most notably Field Marshal Sir Michael Carver.

Return to the United Kingdom
After being replaced as the Eighth Army commander Ritchie was appointed to command the 52nd (Lowland) Infantry Division in September 1942 The division was then being trained in mountain warfare, in the United Kingdom; Ritchie relinquished command to Major-General Edmund Hakewill-Smith in November 1943.

Northwest Europe

Judged by now fit to command a corps, he was selected to command XII Corps in place of Lieutenant-General Montagu Stopford (who was sent to India), which formed part of Lieutenant-General Miles Dempsey's British Second Army and was chosen to participate in the invasion of Normandy. Ritchie was made a Companion of the Order of the Bath on 1 January 1944. Aided by his BGS, initially Roy Urquhart, later James Cassels, Ritchie led XII Corps during the Battle of Normandy in the middle of 1944 and the subsequent campaign in Western Europe, ending in May 1945 with the end of the war in Europe. Ritchie unlike his Eighth Army predecessor Cunningham, regained an active command following his dismissal, suggesting the esteem in which he was held by Brooke, the Chief of the Imperial General Staff. For his services in Northwest Europe Ritchie was made a Knight Commander of the Order of the British Empire on 5 July 1945 and he was twice mentioned in despatches during the campaign, for "gallant and distinguished services", on 22 March and 9 August 1945.

As Richard Mead puts it:

Post-war
After the war Ritchie remained in the British Army, becoming GOC Scottish Command and Governor of Edinburgh Castle in 1945 and GOC Far East Land Forces in 1947.

From December 1948 until retirement from the army, Ritchie held the ceremonial appointment of Aide-de-camp general to the King and from September 1950 he was colonel-in-chief of the Black Watch (Royal Highland Regiment), his old regiment. Following his retirement he emigrated to Canada, where he became a director of the Canadian subsidiary of Tanqueray Gordon & Co. and in 1954 became chairman of the Mercantile & General Reinsurance Co. of Canada. He died at the age of 86 in Toronto.

Family
On 4 December 1937 in Chelsea, he married Catherine Taylor Minnes (1901-1990), daughter of James Arnott Minnes, from Kingston, Ontario, Canada. Their children were Arnott Dugald Neil Ritchie and Isobel Anne Ritchie.

Notes

References

Bibliography

External links

British Army Officers 1939−1945
Generals of World War II

|-

|-

|-

|-

|-
 

|-

 

1897 births
1983 deaths
British Army generals
British Army generals of World War II
British Army personnel of World War I
British Guiana people
British military personnel of the 1936–1939 Arab revolt in Palestine
Black Watch officers
Commandeurs of the Légion d'honneur
Commanders of the Legion of Merit
Commanders of the Order of Orange-Nassau
Companions of the Distinguished Service Order
Graduates of the Royal Military College, Sandhurst
Graduates of the Staff College, Camberley
King's Own Royal Regiment officers
Knights Commander of the Order of the Bath
Knights Grand Cross of the Order of the British Empire
Knights of the Order of St John
People educated at Lancing College
Recipients of the Croix de Guerre 1939–1945 (France)
Recipients of the Military Cross
Recipients of the Silver Cross of the Virtuti Militari